George Campbell Ross C.B., C.B.E. (9 August 1900 – 30 July 1993) was an Engineer and a Rear Admiral in Britain's Royal Navy. He was also the son of Sir Archibald Ross OBE (1867 - March 19, 1931), a pioneering marine engineer.

Service biography

World War I
He served on HMS Warspite, HM Submarine P59 and HMS Vendetta during World War I.

Interwar
Engineering Courses at RN College, Greenwich, and RN Engineering College, Keyham 1919–1921; HMS Hawkins, Flagship of China Station 1921–1924.
Lecturer in Marine Engineering, RN Engineering College 1924–1927; HMS Effingham, Flagship of East Indies Station 1927–1929; HM Dockyard, Chatham 1929–1931; HMS Rodney (29), Atlantic Fleet 1931–1933; Invergordon Mutiny 1931; Assistant Naval Attache, British Embassy, Tokyo 1933–1936; Liaison Officer to Japanese Flagship Asigara, Coronation Review 1937; introduced Oerlikon 20 mm cannon to the RN 1937; HMS Manchester, East Indies Station 1937–1939.

World War II
Engineer-in-Chief's Department, Admiralty 1939–1941; Engineer Officer, HMS Nelson, and Staff Engineer Officer to Flag Officer, Force H, Malta Convoy, North Africa and Sicily 1941–1943; HMS ST ANGELO, Malta, as Staff Engineer Officer, on staff of Capt, Force 'H', Aug–Dec 1943; surrender of Italian Fleet 1943; Aircraft Maintenance and Repair Department, Admiralty 1943–1947;

Postwar
Chief of Staff to R Adm, Reserve Aircraft 1948–1949; Director of Aircraft Maintenance and Repair, Admiralty 1949–1953; retired 1953. After retirement from the Royal Navy Ross joined Armstrong Siddeley as a liaison officer between the company and the Admiralty.

Family life
He married, on 16 September 1929 Alice Behrens, daughter of the banker Paul Behrens (of the Salomon Oppenheim bank) in Berlin, the first German women to marry an Englishman after World War I.

References

Liddell Hart Centre for Military Archives (King's College London, University of London)

Royal Navy rear admirals
1900 births
1993 deaths
Companions of the Order of the Bath
Commanders of the Order of the British Empire